Giovan Donato Giannoni Alitto (1636–1698) was a Roman Catholic prelate who served as Bishop of Ruvo (1680–1698).

Biography
Giovan Donato Giannoni Alitto was born in Bitonto, Italy in 1636.
On 11 March 1680, he was appointed during the papacy of Pope Innocent XI as Bishop of Ruvo.
On 17 March 1680, he was consecrated bishop by Francesco Nerli (iuniore), Archbishop of Florence, with Stefano Brancaccio, Bishop of Viterbo e Tuscania, and Lorenzo Trotti, Bishop of Pavia, serving as co-consecrators. 
He served as Bishop of Ruvo until his death in 1698.

Episcopal succession
While bishop, he was the principal co-consecrator of:
Carolus de Tilly, Bishop of Acerra (1692);
Francesco Antonio Triveri, Bishop of Andria (1692); and
Nicola Cirillo, Bishop of Nicastro (1692).

References

External links and additional sources
 (for Chronology of Bishops) 
 (for Chronology of Bishops) 

17th-century Italian Roman Catholic bishops
Bishops appointed by Pope Innocent XI
1636 births
1698 deaths